Midwest Training and Ice Center is an ice arena and gymnastics and recreational sport facility in Dyer, Indiana. It features an Olympic size sheet of ice for hockey, figure skating and open skating, a state-of-the-art fitness center and facilities for gymnastics.

The arena was the home of the junior ice hockey team the Illiana Blackbirds of the USPHL Midwest until 2016. It is currently home to another team with the same nickname, the Midwest Blackbirds. The ice arena is also the home of local high school hockey teams and recreational teams. Current seating capacity for spectators is 1,500.

References

External links
Official Midwest Training & Ice Center Arena website

Indoor arenas in Indiana
Indoor ice hockey venues in the United States
Sports venues in Indiana
All American Hockey League (2008–2011) arenas
Buildings and structures in Lake County, Indiana
Ice hockey venues in Indiana